Taskmaster (Anthony "Tony" Masters) is a fictional character appearing in American comic books published by Marvel Comics. Created by writer David Michelinie and artist George Pérez, the character made his debut in The Avengers #195 (May 1980). Possessing photographic reflexes that allow him to mimic any fighting style at the cost of his long and short-term memory, he has served as an adversary of superheroes such as Captain America, Ant-Man and Spider-Man among others in the Marvel Universe. He is usually depicted as a mercenary hired by numerous criminal organizations to act as a training instructor, and is the biological father of Finesse.

The character has been adapted from the comics into various forms of media, including several animated television series and video games. A female version of Taskmaster named Antonia Dreykov appears in the Marvel Cinematic Universe film Black Widow (2021), portrayed by Olga Kurylenko. Kurylenko will reprise the role in the upcoming film Thunderbolts (2024).

Publication history
The Taskmaster first appeared briefly in The Avengers #195 (May 1980), created by writer David Michelinie and artist George Pérez. making his full debut in Avengers #196 (June 1980).

The Taskmaster appeared in his own limited series Taskmaster #1–4 (2002), which was followed by a supporting role in Agent X #1–15 (2002–2003). The character went on to feature prominently in Avengers: The Initiative as a supporting character in #8–19 (2008–2009) and Avengers: The Initiative Annual #1 (2008) then later as a central character in #20–35 (2009–2010) during the Dark Reign and Siege storylines. Age of Heroes #3 (2010) provided the prologue for the Taskmaster's second limited series Taskmaster vol. 2 #1–4 (2010–2011). In 2011 Taskmaster got his first solo graphic novel collecting a four-issue story—Taskmaster: Unthinkable.

As part of Marvel's 2012–2015 rebranding, Marvel NOW!, Taskmaster joined a new team of Secret Avengers.

Fictional character biography

Taskmaster is a mysterious figure believed to have been born in Bronx, New York City. He is able to mimic the physical movements of anyone he witnesses; writers differ on whether this counts as a "super power". He claims to have had this ability since childhood. He is a combat instructor and part-time mercenary. Initially portrayed as a villain, he has also trained U.S. Agent and other neophyte superheroes at the behest of the US government. As a mercenary, he has no ideology except that of his employer. Due to his ability to imitate the techniques and armory of other heroes and villains, Taskmaster has occasionally been used to impersonate other characters.

Tony Masters first demonstrated unusual abilities during childhood. After watching a cowboy show on television, he found himself able to duplicate the sophisticated rope tricks he had just watched the cowboy perform. Psychiatrists explained Tony's abilities to be a form of photographic memory which they called "photographic reflexes". He employed his power several times during his youth for personal gain, most notably when he became a star quarterback of his high school football team after watching one pro football game. Upon graduation, he briefly considered a career as a crime fighter, but opted instead to be a professional criminal, which he perceived to be far more lucrative.

He then began a program of observing the fighting techniques of numerous costumed heroes and villains (using archival television news broadcasts). He initially used his fighting skills to execute several successful grand larcenies, but he had not properly anticipated the dangers involved. He decided to use his stolen capital to establish a center for training aspiring criminals to turn into polished professionals. His goal was to become a supplier for criminal organizations around the world.

Designing a costume with a white cowl and skull mask, he took the name "Taskmaster" and began to train many thugs at criminal academies he had located around the United States. However, his existence was eventually revealed when Pernell Solomon of the Solomon Institute for the Criminally Insane (a front for one of these academies) used the school's resources to create a clone of himself when the administrator required an organ donation, as he possessed an extremely rare blood type. Learning of his intended death, the clone managed to contact the Avengers for help. Taskmaster captured Yellowjacket, the Wasp, and Ant-Man when the Avengers invaded the school premises trying to rescue the clone, but the other Avengers followed, exposing his front operation. Taskmaster held his own against Captain America and Iron Man, but was subsequently forced to flee after a confrontation with Jocasta since his lack of experience with Jocasta's abilities made it impossible to predict the robot's next move. Taskmaster later established a new training academy in Manhattan, where he battled Spider-Man and Ant-Man, and then escaped. He later used a traveling carnival as a mobile base, where he battled Hawkeye and Ant-Man, and then escaped again. He next trained henchmen for the Black Abbott. Alongside Black Abbott, he battled Spider-Man and Nomad, and escaped yet again.

Deciding to further explore the use of a circus as a front for his academy, Taskmaster took over yet another small outfit, and used it for many months to great success. However, while it was playing a small town in Ohio, the Thing and Vance Astrovik (who would later take the name Justice) assisted a government agent in foiling Taskmaster's activities. While escaping, Taskmaster was captured by a group of U.S. Secret Service agents and taken into custody. There is reason to believe that the Red Skull was behind the Taskmaster's capture, since a group of normal men were able to capture him. Through Douglas Rockwell (the head of the President's Commission on Superhuman Activities), Mr. Smith arranged for Taskmaster to train John Walker to make him appear to be the real Captain America. To conceal the Red Skull's involvement, Rockwell had the Commission work out a deal to have years taken off Taskmaster's sentence in return for training Walker. After Taskmaster successfully trained Walker in Rogers' fighting style and the use of a shield, the Red Skull arranged for him to escape from the Commission's detention center so he could continue training lackeys and Red Skull himself.

Taskmaster's more skilled, successful, and notable students include such characters as Crossbones and Cutthroat (both the Red Skull's henchmen), U.S. Agent, Hauptmann Deutschland, Diamondback (Steve Rogers's one-time girlfriend), Spymaster, Spider-Woman, and Agent X. On the other hand, Taskmaster also trains many of his students to serve as low-rent henchmen and cannon fodder. In his early appearances, Taskmaster mentions putting intellect-reducing drugs in the diet of his students. He also routinely sent groups of his more disappointing students to serve as "sparring partners" for the Red Skull, routinely engaging several of them at a time and killing them all (Hauptmann Deutschland infiltrated the academy and used one such session as an opportunity to kidnap Red Skull). He has also employed other supervillains, such as when he hired Anaconda as his academy's calisthenics instructor.

On another occasion, Taskmaster was hired by the Triune Understanding — a religious group secretly masterminding a smear campaign to paint the Avengers as being religiously and racially intolerant — to stage an attack on a Triune facility. Posing as Captain America, he contacted Warbird, Ant-Man, Silverclaw and Captain Marvel, claiming that he needed their help to destroy a Triune building containing a mind-control machine. Although they saw through his deception and subsequently defeated him — thanks to Captain Marvel transforming into Rick Jones mere milliseconds away from Taskmaster, thus causing a complete change of attack before Taskmaster could react — the building was destroyed in the ensuing battle and Taskmaster escaped, leaving the heroes lacking any evidence of their story.

Taskmaster continued to train numerous villains and thugs until the Avengers began to search out and shut down some of his academies across the United States. Taskmaster began to spend more time working as a mercenary to make up for the loss of profit. This led him to join Agency X at the behest of his love interest Sandi Brandenberg, in missions from time to time, while continuing to teach at his academies around the world. More recently, Taskmaster is once again seen as a hired mercenary, contracted by the Committee to kill Moon Knight (Marc Spector). Taskmaster was misled with information that Moon Knight was broken, friendless and desiring death. During the conflict these factors all proved to be false as Marc's ex-girlfriend and butler came to Spector's defense and found the will to fight back. Despite his superior fighting abilities, Taskmaster was defeated. Moon Knight then carved off part of Taskmaster's facemask, though left him alive.

Taskmaster also worked at training henchmen to copy fighting styles of specific heroes. Taskmaster unleashed Deathshield (trained to fight like Captain America), Jagged Bow (trained to fight like Hawkeye), and Blood Spider (trained to fight like Spider-Man) to face off against Spider-Man and Solo. The three were defeated, while Taskmaster escaped yet again.

When the "Civil War" broke out, Taskmaster was hired by the government and enrolled into a team of Thunderbolts and given temporary amnesty to take down the Secret Avengers. He later battles the Secret Avengers in New York. He attempts to kill Susan "Sue" Storm, only for Reed Richards to take the bullet. Enraged, Sue crushes him with an invisible telekinetic field, rendering him unconscious. He was sent to the Negative Zone Prison with the other "Major-League" members of the Thunderbolts army such as Lady Deathstrike, but was apparently freed by Deadpool. To regain his own reputation as a mercenary, Deadpool frees Taskmaster from his imprisonment to have a showdown with him while potential merc contractors watched from their captive position in a nearby prison. Taskmaster is again referred to as Tasky by Deadpool, and a fight ensues between him and the manacled merc. He mentions his professional ethics, but this simply comes down to deciding to simply maim his opponent rather than kill him. In the end, he is defeated by Deadpool who, in spite of the victory, fails to impress his captive audience. After being thanked for letting him win, Taskmaster tells Deadpool that he had not let him win, "The truth is... You're that good. You've always been that good. Which won't get you a cup of coffee until you figure out how to be a professional..." Taskmaster was given a full presidential pardon for his efforts in testing the security of the S.H.I.E.L.D. Helicarrier, in which he was able to break in and place Deputy Director Maria Hill in his sights. Though he was allowed to leave, a threatening message left in Hill's private bathroom revealed that if he ever desired, infiltrating S.H.I.E.L.D. would be no difficult feat.

Taskmaster replaces Gauntlet as Camp Hammond's drill instructor and is tasked with training registered superheroes for the Fifty State Initiative. Taskmaster would also be involved in MVP's cloning process inputting (via technology) the original's move set for the Scarlet Spiders as well as the move set of Spider-Man.

Taskmaster is hired by Deadpool to help his old enemy and occasional friend defeat the Thunderbolts. Being disguised as Deadpool, he gets captured and is about to be beheaded when the real Deadpool saves him. Deadpool finally pays him, but he expresses annoyance at being paid from an ATM due to his major villain status.

During the "Dark Reign" storyline, Taskmaster is chosen to lead the Shadow Initiative after the Skrull invasion, with their first mission to take down Hardball's HYDRA cell in Madripoor. Along with Constrictor, Bengal, Typhoid Mary and Komodo, Taskmaster stealthily leads the group into the country, but they are soon discovered by HYDRA. Norman Osborn appoints Taskmaster to train criminals for the new Initiative, to behave like heroes. His first task is to retrain Penance. Also, when Blastaar takes control of the Negative Zone prison 42, Taskmaster is ordered to lead a squad to take the prison back. Later, he gives Night Thrasher a severe bullet wound to the head, allowing Osborn to take Night Thrasher prisoner. When Emma Frost and Namor resign from the Cabal, Taskmaster is offered membership. Taskmaster was present at a meeting when Osborn discusses about Asgard. He is severely wounded at the meeting as a result of an attack by Doctor Doom. While recovering in a hospital, Taskmaster declined to join the Cabal. Osborn cut the oxygen tank next to Taskmaster's bed, reminding him that it was Osborn who plucked him from obscurity. Taskmaster then agrees to join in the siege of Asgard. During the battle, he fights with both Steve Rogers and Bucky Barnes as Captain America. As Asgard falls, Taskmaster finds Constrictor and the two beat a hasty retreat, but not before Taskmaster taunts Osborn about how Taskmaster helped Deadpool. After Osborn's ultimate defeat, Taskmaster and Constrictor went back to mercenary work.

A false rumor is spread that Taskmaster is leaking information about the criminal underworld to Rogers's new 'heroic' regime. A bounty of $1,000,000,000 is placed on the Taskmaster's head by the mysterious Org. The hordes of AIM, HYDRA, the Secret Empire, ULTIMATUM, the Cyber Ninjas, the Black Choppers, the Trenchcoat Mafia, the Legions of the Living Lightning, the Militiamen, the Sons of the Serpent, and the Inquisition take up the chase to claim the money. Taskmaster, ambushed in a small diner, manages to best his opponents. But the diner's waitress, Mercedes Merced, gets entangled in the saga and is included in the bounty. Taskmaster reveals to Mercedes that his powers cause him to lose his explicit memory, meaning that he cannot remember anything about his personal life, and the only way for the whole ordeal to be over is to re-discover Taskmaster's origins. Taskmaster and Mercedes' quest takes them to Mexico to battle the Don of the Dead, and then to Bolivia to the village where everyone is Hitler. Inside an exact replica of Himmler's Wewelsburg Castle, Taskmaster regains his memories. He remembers being S.H.I.E.L.D. agent Tony Masters that had been sent to Bolivia to terminate Horst Gorscht, the Nazi scientist responsible for a corrupted version of the super-soldier serum. Gorscht had developed a new serum that could unlock the mind's potential to absorb knowledge instantaneously. With Gorscht's serum and test notes destroyed, Masters injected the last of the serum into himself. Having regained these memories, Taskmaster recognizes Mercedes' voice as being the same as 'The Hub', a mysterious voice who works for the Org. Taskmaster shoots Mercedes in the shoulder and threatens to kill her if she doesn't start talking. Mercedes reveals that the Org is a S.H.I.E.L.D. front, and that she is not only an agent, but also Taskmaster's wife. Miles above the Wewelsburg castle in an airship, the Minions' International Liberation Front (a secret group composed of henchmen from all of the major terrorist organizations), led by Redshirt the Uber-Henchman, reveal their deception and plot to rule the criminal underground by using Taskmaster to lead them straight to the Org. Redshirt leads the Minions' International Liberation Front (or the acronym MILF for short) into battle against the Taskmaster and Mercedes. Mercedes convinces the Taskmaster to trust her and work together to fend off the forces of MILF. During the battle, Taskmaster regains his memories of Mercedes and how he fell in love with her. Before they can reconcile, Taskmaster is attacked from behind by Redshirt who has genetically altered his body and mastered superior fighting skills to those of Taskmaster. Redshirt gains the upper hand as the pair push each other to the limits. Mercedes tries to intervene to protect her husband, but is quickly and effortlessly cast to one side. Enraged, Taskmaster attacks Redshirt and delivers a killing blow using Redshirt's own fighting style (which causes Taskmaster to lose his memories once more). Taskmaster, not recognizing Mercedes or his reasons for being there, flees and leaves Mercedes alone once more.

Avengers Academy student Finesse later seeks out Taskmaster, thinking that he may be her long-lost father. When she finds Taskmaster, Finesse ends up sparring with him. After much sparring, Taskmaster finally relents to tell Finesse that he very well might be and most likely is her father, but that the powers to learn so much about others’ movements and techniques have caused him to forget important things in life. Knowing he likely will not remember the conversation in a couple days, Taskmaster tells Finesse that he wanted to fight her so he might remember her.

During the 2011 "Fear Itself" storyline, Taskmaster comes to the aid of Alpha Flight when it comes to forming a resistance against the Unity Party that was formed by Master of the World.

In order for the Masters of Evil to obtain the Crown of Wolves for the Shadow Council, Max Fury hired Taskmaster to retrieve it only for Taskmaster to demand more money for the job and he hid in the Hole. The Secret Avengers went to the Hole to get the Crown of Wolves before Fury got his hands on it. This led to a fight between Taskmaster and Agent Venom. However, Taskmaster escaped and returned the crown to Fury, only for Max to apparently kill Taskmaster when he asks for payment. When the crown's effects don't function for Max, Taskmaster takes the crown for himself, which saves his life by making him the Avatar for the Abyss. As the Abyss spreads, the Secret Avengers members Venom and Ant-Man are able to remove the crown and stop the spread, while Taskmaster and the Masters of Evil are left behind when the Avengers leave with Max in their custody.

The criminals of Bagalia imprison Taskmaster and are preparing to offer him up to the highest bidder. S.H.I.E.L.D. and the Secret Avengers come to rescue him and offer him a position. As their inside man, Taskmaster is part of the new High Council of A.I.M. as the Minister of Defense. Mockingbird later goes to A.I.M. Island to assist Taskmaster in helping make contact between the Iron Patriot A.I. drones and James Rhodes. After the mission goes south and Mockingbird is left stranded on AIM Island, Taskmaster works undercover to free her. But when he gets the chance to get her off the island, she doesn't respond to anything he says until both are captured. While being interrogated, Taskmaster is shot and seemingly killed by Mockingbird apparently under the control of Scientist Supreme (Andrew Forson). However, Mentallo discovered that Mockingbird purposely missed any vitals and Taskmaster survived.

At the time when Captain America was brainwashed into being a Hydra sleeper agent by Red Skull's clone using the powers of Kobik, Taskmaster later relocated to Bagalia where he became its sheriff.

When Taskmaster and Black Ant (Eric O'Grady's Life Model Decoy counterpart) found out what was done to Captain America to be made into a Hydra sleeper agent, they planned to have a parley with Maria Hill to discuss this with only for the new Madame Hydra (Elisa Sinclair) to get to them first. Impressed with the fighting skills of the two of them, Madame Hydra made them bodyguards.

During the "Secret Empire" storyline, Taskmaster appears as a member of Hydra's Avengers. During the battle in Washington DC, Taskmaster and Black Ant witness their teammate Odinson having enough of working for Hydra and striking them down. The two of them defect from Hydra and free the captive Champions. When Taskmaster and Black Ant asks for them to put in a good word for them, Spider-Man webs them up anyway.

Taskmaster and Black Ant later attack Empire State University where Dr. Curt Connors was teaching a class. As the inhibitor chip prevents Connors into turning into Lizard, Peter Parker sneaks off to become Spider-Man. During his fight with Black Ant and Taskmaster, Spider-Man is exposed to the Isotope Genome Accelerator that splits him from his Peter Parker side.

In a prelude to "Hunted", Taskmaster and Black Ant work with Kraven the Hunter and Arcade in capturing some animal-themed characters for his upcoming hunt. Black Ant and Taskmaster are talking about the Hunt. Taskmaster betrays Black Ant saying that Black Ant is an animal-themed villain and tasers Black Ant to get more money. Lizard finds Taskmaster at the Pop-Up with No Name. Lizard proceeds to poisons him by slipping a poison into her beer. Lizard offers Taskmaster the antidote if he can take Lizard to Central Park. While traveling there, Lizard and Taskmaster defeat Vermin, freeing innocent bystanders. Taskmaster helps put a taser chip in Lizard's body, and takes him to Arcade. Taskmaster frees Lizard from his binds and Lizard tells Taskmaster that the poison will wear off in 24 hours. Taskmaster makes off with Black Ant before Yellowjacket, Human Fly, Razorback, Toad, and White Rabbit can take revenge on him. As they leave, Taskmaster states that Black Ant would've done the same for him. When Black Ant asks "Do you mean the betrayal part or the rescue part?" All Taskmaster can say is "yeah!"

During the "King in Black" storyline, Taskmaster is among the villains recruited by Mayor Wilson Fisk to be part of his Thunderbolts at the time of Knull's invasion. While having argued with Mister Fear over who was the first villain to wear a skull mask, Taskmaster becomes the de facto field leader of the group. Following the deaths of Ampere and Snakehead, Taskmaster couldn't stop Rhino from walking off and tells the remaining members not to help the Manhattan Defenders. He and the Thunderbolts arrive at Ravencroft to meet with Norman Osborn who Mayor Fisk claims can help them defeat Knull.

At the conclusion of "The Chameleon Conspiracy" arc, Foreigner hired Taskmaster and Black Ant to help get revenge on Spider-Man.

During the "Sinister War" storyline, Taskmaster was with Foreigner, Black Ant, Chance, Jack O'Lantern, and Slyde when they are sent by Kindred to attack Spider-Man after Kindred had disrupted their armored car robbery.

During the "Devil's Reign" storyline, Taskmaster appears as a member of Mayor Wilson Fisk's latest incarnation of the Thunderbolts at the time when Mayor Fisk passed a law that forbids superhero activity. He and Whiplash hold the staff of the Daily Bugle hostage to draw out Spider-Man. Taskmaster states that the person who hired him has an incomplete file on Spider-Man as Taskmaster fights Spider-Man up to the point where Whiplash is goaded into attacking him. Despite being weakened by Whiplash, Spider-Man tries to ask Taskmaster if they can take it outside as Taskmaster places a power dampener collar on him and throws him out the window. Spider-Man uses his webbing to slow his descent to the ground as the NYPD operatives move in on him.

Powers and abilities
Taskmaster injected himself with SS-Hauptsturmführer Horst Gorscht's primer, an elaborate modification of the adrenal steroid cortisol designed to unlock the mind's procedural memory potential. This enhanced Taskmaster's natural ability to absorb knowledge instantaneously. This ability is linked to his muscle memory, allowing Taskmaster to instantly replicate the physical movement of peak-level humans. Taskmaster is not capable of duplicating a physical feat if the effort to do so requires superhuman effort; for instance, while he could view an opponent lifting a car, he could not do so because his body cannot duplicate the superhuman strength. Using these "photographic reflexes", Taskmaster is highly skilled in various forms of combat, as an exceptional martial artist (mimicking Elektra, Iron Fist, Shang-Chi), a skilled swordsman (Black Knight, Silver Samurai, Swordsman), a deadly accurate marksman (Captain America with a shield, Hawkeye with a bow and arrow, the Punisher with firearms, and Bullseye with various projectiles) as well as displaying a strenuously honed athletic ability (Black Panther, Daredevil, Spider-Man). Taskmaster has also demonstrated the ability to use every fighting style he has watched at the same time. Once the Taskmaster has mastered an opponent's physical movements, he can then predict his opponent's next attack. However, one of the few people shown capable of negating Taskmaster's abilities are Deadpool, whose manic personality makes him nearly impossible to predict,; Mister X, who uses his psychic abilities to get the better of Taskmaster in a fight and Slapstick, due to his very flexible cartoony body cause Taskmaster to break his own spine upon copying the hero's ability.; A side effect of the primer is severe declarative memory loss. The more implicit memories (i.e. knowledge and abilities) he learns, the more explicit memories (i.e. personal experience) he loses. Because of his explicit memory loss, the Org (Mercedes Merced) has acted as Taskmaster's surrogate memory, his banker, and his handler for his entire criminal career.

By viewing a video in fast-forward, Taskmaster can learn to replicate human movement at near-superhuman speed. However, this puts his body under intense strain and can only be used for short periods of time. He also has the ability to manipulate his vocal cords to mimic the voices of others. The Taskmaster is also skilled in meditation techniques that allow him to slow his breathing and heart rate and survive for extended periods of time without air, this also means that to the untrained eye he will appear to be dead. He also claims to have learned forensic methods from CIA Agents and Mossad Operatives. Taskmaster is also capable of utilizing chi, but under exceptional circumstances. Taskmaster was once shown to have aquaphobia (the fear of water), but later overcame his fears.

Weaponry
As he is able to replicate numerous fighting techniques, Taskmaster carries an extensive arsenal of weapons on his person, most commonly using a sword and a replica of Captain America's shield. He also carries a bow and a quiver of arrows, a billy club, a lasso, nunchaku, throwing darts, and various firearms. Taskmaster once used a stolen S.H.I.E.L.D. device that was able to create various forms of weaponry (such as arrows and shields) using solid energy.

Other versions
Alternative versions of the Taskmaster have appeared in various Marvel titles in minor roles.

What If
In a What If? storyline What if... Steve Rogers had refused to give up being Captain America? (vol. 2) #3 (1989), the Taskmaster trained the Super-Patriot and the Buckies to replace Captain America.

Avataars: Covenant of the Shield
An alternate version of the Taskmaster appears in Avataars: Covenant of the Shield #1 (2000) where the Marvel Universe is re-imagined in a fantasy setting. In this reality, the Taskmaster is an assassin known as the Deathmaster.

Marvel Universe Millennial Visions 2001
In the Marvel Universe Millennial Visions 2001 (2002) storyline Thunderbolts: Give a Guy a Break, Hawkeye takes it upon himself to force supervillains to seek redemption. The Taskmaster is among the supervillains hypnotized by the Ringmaster and forced to become a member of the Thunderbolts.

JLA/Avengers
In JLA/Avengers #4 (2004), part of the Marvel/DC co-published crossover series, the Taskmaster is among the supervillains to confront Batman, Black Panther, Black Widow and Huntress in the final battle with Krona.

Marvel Apes
A primate version of the Taskmaster appears in the Marvel Apes titles Marvel Apes: Evolution Starts Here #1 (2009), Marvel: Apes: Speedball Special #1 (2009) and Marvel Apes: Grunt Line Special #1 (2009).

Marvel Universe vs. the Punisher
In Marvel Universe vs. the Punisher #4 (September 2010), where the Marvel Universe is infected by a cannibal plague, the Taskmaster is killed when the Red Hulk tears his head off.

Deadpool Max
A female version of Taskmaster appeared in the Marvel Max series Deadpool Max. This version became a mother figure to a young version of Deadpool when she kidnapped his Muskrat troop. She was later revealed to be an operative for United States interest, a potential cult leader and child molester.

House of M
In the House of M reality, the Taskmaster appeared as a member of the strike force known as the Brotherhood. Although not a mutant, he used his abilities to pass as one, since humans (even super-powered humans) were treated as second-class citizens. However, after he was beaten by Luke Cage for the murder of Tigra, he was found to be a human masquerading as a mutant.

Marvel vs. Capcom
The Taskmaster appears in Marvel Vs. Capcom: Fate of Two Worlds #1 (2011) based on his appearance in the Marvel vs. Capcom 3: Fate of Two Worlds video game. He briefly appears in Latveria, having been hired by Dr. Doom to aid in the invasion of the second Earth and grows increasingly impatient due to Albert Wesker's inability to fully link the two worlds.

Ultraverse
The Taskmaster appears in the Malibu Comics (also known as the Ultraverse) series Siren (1995), Siren #1–3 (1995) and Siren Special #1 (1996) as a supporting character.

Age of Ultron
In the Age of Ultron story, the Taskmaster is depicted as working with the Black Panther and the Red Hulk in Chicago attempting to capture Ultron Sentinel technology. Successful in doing so, Red Hulk holds off the Ultron minions to allow Taskmaster and Black Panther to escape. When Taskmaster tries to run away with one of the Ultron Sentinels, Red Hulk tells him he doesn't trust him, and then kills him.

Ultimate Marvel
The Ultimate Marvel version of Taskmaster appears in Ultimate Comics: Spider-Man; this iteration is an African-American mercenary. Hired by Phillip Roxxon, he confronts Spider-Man, Spider-Woman, Cloak & Dagger and Bombshell, and displays the ability to absorb and re-channel energy-based superpowers. Taskmaster is eventually defeated by the young amateur superheroes.

In other media

Television
 Taskmaster appears in Ultimate Spider-Man, voiced primarily by Clancy Brown, and briefly by Stan Lee. Throughout the series, he has several confrontations with Spider-Man, only to be defeated by him and his fellow S.H.I.E.L.D. trainees each time, with his most notable appearances seeing him form the Thunderbolts alongside Norman Osborn.
 Taskmaster appears in Avengers Assemble, voiced again by Clancy Brown.

Film
 Taskmaster makes a cameo appearance in the anime film Avengers Confidential: Black Widow & Punisher, as a member of Leviathan.
 Taskmaster appears in Iron Man and Captain America: Heroes United, voiced again by Clancy Brown. He is hired by the Red Skull to fight Captain America and Iron Man. 
 A female version of Taskmaster named Antonia Dreykov appears in the 2021 live-action Marvel Cinematic Universe (MCU) film Black Widow (2021), portrayed by Olga Kurylenko. This version is the daughter of General Dreykov who completes missions for the Red Room before Natasha Romanoff undoes Antonia's brainwashing.
 Kurylenko will reprise her role as Antonia Dreykov in the upcoming MCU film Thunderbolts (2024).

Video games
 Taskmaster appears as a playable character in Marvel vs. Capcom 3: Fate of Two Worlds and Ultimate Marvel vs. Capcom 3, voiced by Steve Blum. In his single player ending, he profits off of exercise videos and self-merchandising after defeating Galactus.
 Taskmaster appears as a playable character in Marvel Heroes, voiced again by Steve Blum.
 Taskmaster appears as the final boss of Captain America's storyline in Avengers Initiative, voiced again by Steve Blum.
 Taskmaster appears as a boss and unlockable playable character in Marvel: Avengers Alliance.
 Taskmaster appears as an unlockable playable character in Lego Marvel Super Heroes, voiced again by Steve Blum.
 Taskmaster appears as an unlockable playable character in Marvel: Avengers Alliance Tactics.
 Taskmaster appears as a boss in Captain America: The Winter Soldier - The Official Game, voiced by Roger Craig Smith.
 Taskmaster appears as an unlockable playable character in Marvel Avengers Academy, voiced by Adam Montoya.
 Taskmaster appears as an unlockable playable character in Lego Marvel's Avengers.
 Taskmaster appears as a boss in Marvel's Spider-Man, voiced by Brian Bloom. In a side mission, he sets up a series of challenges around Manhattan to test Spider-Man's abilities while observing him from afar. Once all of the challenges are completed, Taskmaster confronts Spider-Man personally. While the former is defeated, he escapes after revealing he had been hired by a mysterious organization to determine if Spider-Man was worth recruiting.
 Taskmaster appears as the first boss in Marvel's Avengers, voiced by Walter Gray IV. This version is a former S.H.I.E.L.D. agent who runs a private mercenary group and has history with Black Widow. Additionally, clones of Taskmaster created by A.I.M. appear in side-missions.
 Taskmaster appears as a playable character in Marvel: Future Fight as part of the Secret Empire update.
 Taskmaster appears as a purchasable outfit in Fortnite Battle Royale.

Merchandise
 Taskmaster is the 104th figurine in The Classic Marvel Figurine Collection.
 Taskmaster is the 124th figurine in the "Marvel Pop!" line made by Funko.
 A figure of Taskmaster was released in series 11 (Legendary Rider Series) of Toy Biz's 6" Marvel Legends line.
 A figure of Taskmaster was released as part of the exclusive 2007 series of the Marvel Minimates line.
 A figure of Taskmaster was released in wave 20 of the Marvel Super Hero Squad line, packed with Deadpool.
 A figure of Taskmaster was released in a two-pack of Marvel Universe figures, part of the series "Marvel's Greatest Battles". Taskmaster comes packaged with Deadpool and a reprinted copy of Cable & Deadpool #36.
 A figure of Taskmaster was released in the 2014 Lego Marvel Super Heroes set 76018 Hulk Lab Smash.
 Hasbro released a figure of Taskmaster, based on his second design in Ultimate Spider-Man, in their Marvel Legends Red Onslaught Build-A-Figure line, marketed under the banner "Mercenaries of Mayhem".
 A figure of Taskmaster modelled after the original comics appearance was released in the 2018 Marvel Legends Avengers: Infinity War Thanos Build-A-Figure line.
 A figure of Taskmaster modelled after the character's appearance in the MCU was released in the 2020 Marvel Legends Black Widow assortment.

Tabletop games 
 Taskmaster has been featured in Heroclix Collectible Miniatures Game.
 Taskmaster has been featured in the Marvel Crisis Protocol Miniatures Game.

Collected editions

References

External links
 Taskmaster at Marvel.com
 Taskmaster at Marvel Wiki

Villains in animated television series
Avengers (comics) characters
Characters created by David Michelinie
Characters created by George Pérez
Comics characters introduced in 1980
Fictional assassins in comics
Fictional blade and dart throwers
Fictional characters from New York City
Fictional characters with eidetic memory
Fictional characters with memory disorders
Fictional mercenaries in comics
Fictional schoolteachers
Fictional secret agents and spies
Fictional shield fighters
Fictional swordfighters in comics
Marvel Comics male supervillains
Marvel Comics martial artists
Marvel Comics mutates
Marvel Comics titles
S.H.I.E.L.D. agents
Video game bosses